The Carrie Diaries is an American television teen drama which premiered on January 14, 2013, on The CW. The series, developed by Amy B. Harris, is a prequel to the HBO television series Sex and the City and based on the book of the same name by Candace Bushnell. On May 9, 2013, The CW renewed The Carrie Diaries for a second season, consisting of 13 episodes. On May 8, 2014, The CW canceled The Carrie Diaries after two seasons.

Over the course of two seasons, 26 episodes of The Carrie Diaries aired.

Series overview

Episodes

Season 1 (2013)

Season 2 (2013–14)

References

External links
 
 

Carrie Diaries
Carrie Diaries
Carrie Diaries